East Aldfield is a small hamlet in the Outaouais region of Quebec, Canada, part of the Municipality of La Pêche. It is located approximately 80 kilometres northwest of Ottawa, on the Cleo Fournier Road, north of the intersection with Quebec Route 366.

References

Communities in Outaouais